Helen Ford (born Helen Isabel Barnett; June 6, 1894, Troy, New York–January 19, 1982, Glendale, California) was an American actress.

Biography
Ford's father was a manufacturer in Troy, and she was considered a musical prodigy  as a child. She studied voice and piano at a conservatory of music in Troy. 

Ford appeared in a production of The Heart of Annie Wood in New York in 1918 and in Sometime shortly thereafter. In 1920, she had the role of Toinette in Always You, Oscar Hammerstein's first musical. She was a  stage actress in musicals in the 1920s. A "Rodgers, Hart, and Fields' favorite", she starred in three of their Broadway productions: Dearest Enemy (1925), Peggy-Ann (1926) and Chee-Chee (1928). She also starred in the touring production of Dearest Enemy.

She went on to appear in films and television programs, including The Raid.

In 1926, Ford was involved in a court case in District Court in New York City. The trial related to her appearance at the Knickerbocker Theater "clad only in a barrel". The trial focused on whether her husband, George Ford, had committed perjury when he told a grand jury that the barrel did not contain champagne.

On August 9, 1918, she married George Ford, who produced touring Shakespearean festivals.

She died of a stroke on January 19, 1982. She was cremated and her ashes interred in the crypt below the chapel at Grand View Memorial Park Cemetery in Glendale, California.

Filmography

References

External links

1894 births
1982 deaths
American stage actresses
American film actresses
20th-century American actresses
Burials at Grand View Memorial Park Cemetery